Tamukkam Palace is a palace located in Madurai, Tamil Nadu, India. Literally the Tamil word Tamukkam (Tamil:தமுக்கம்) means summer house. It was built in c. 1670, and was the summer palace of Rani Mangammal, the queen regent of the Madurai Nayak kingdom. Taken over by the British, Tamukkam became the official residence of the District Collectors. It now houses the Mahatma Gandhi Museum.

See also
 Tamukkam Maidanam (Ground)

References 

Madurai Nayak dynasty
Buildings and structures in Madurai
Palaces in Tamil Nadu
Tourist attractions in Madurai